Raapenberg Bird Sanctuary is a  protected area in Cape Town, located on the Liesbeek river near the suburb of Observatory.

The sanctuary consists of a section of the Liesbeek River, with parkland, trees, lawn and picnic sites. It is an important breeding site for a variety of water bird species, such as Sacred Ibis (Threskiornis aethiopicus), Egyptian Geese (Alopochen aegyptiacus) and many duck species. However, the sanctuary is badly overgrown with alien invasive plants which damage the river system and its biodiversity. The river itself is polluted, but is being rehabilitated for recreational activities.

The area is intended to form part of the Two Rivers Urban Park (TRUP), which will include many surrounding areas to form a large, integrated natural area in Cape Town. It will centre on the meeting point of the Liesbeek and Black River and will include several Provincial Heritage Sites, such as: 
 the South African Astronomical Observatory (1827), 
 Valkenberg Homestead (1830)
 Valkenberg Hospital (1899)
 The Nieuwe Molen Windmill 
 The Oude Molen Farmhouse complex

See also
 Biodiversity of Cape Town
 List of nature reserves in Cape Town
 Cape Lowland Freshwater Wetland
 City of Cape Town Nature Reserves. Free Booklet

References

 
Nature reserves in Cape Town
Protected areas of the Western Cape